Ernest Follette "Kid" Mohler (December 13, 1870 – November 4, 1961) was a Major League Baseball player born in Oneida, Illinois. He played in three games for the Washington Senators of the National League in 1894. His minor league career stretched from 1890 through 1914, mostly in the Pacific Coast League, where he played 1,600 games and notched over 1,400 hits. He was elected to the Pacific Coast League Hall of Fame as part of the 2012 class.

Sources 

Major League Baseball second basemen
Washington Senators (1891–1899) players
Baseball players from Illinois
19th-century baseball players
1870 births
1961 deaths
People from Oneida, Illinois
Lincoln Rustlers players
Des Moines Prohibitionist players
Davenport Pilgrims players
Deadwood Metropolitans players
St. Joseph Saints players
San Francisco Seals (baseball) managers
Des Moines Prohibitionists players
Des Moines Indians players
Grand Rapids Rippers players
Grand Rapids Gold Bugs players
London Cockneys players
London Tecumsehs (baseball) players
Denver Grizzlies (baseball) players